The arrondissement of Saint-Dié-des-Vosges is an arrondissement of France in the Vosges department in the Grand Est région. It has 96 communes.

Composition

The communes of the arrondissement of Saint-Dié-des-Vosges, and their INSEE codes, are:
 
Allarmont (88005) 
Anould (88009) 
Arrentès-de-Corcieux (88014) 
Ban-de-Laveline (88032) 
Ban-de-Sapt (88033) 
Ban-sur-Meurthe-Clefcy (88106) 
Barbey-Seroux (88035) 
Basse-sur-le-Rupt (88037) 
Belval (88053) 
Bertrimoutier (88054) 
Le Beulay (88057) 
Biffontaine (88059) 
Bois-de-Champ (88064) 
La Bourgonce (88068) 
La Bresse (88075) 
Celles-sur-Plaine (88082) 
Champdray (88085) 
La Chapelle-devant-Bruyères (88089) 
Châtas (88093) 
Cleurie (88109) 
Coinches (88111) 
Combrimont (88113) 
Corcieux (88115) 
Cornimont (88116) 
La Croix-aux-Mines (88120) 
Denipaire (88128) 
Entre-deux-Eaux (88159) 
Étival-Clairefontaine (88165) 
La Forge (88177) 
Fraize (88181) 
Frapelle (88182) 
Gemaingoutte (88193) 
Gérardmer (88196) 
Gerbamont (88197) 
Gerbépal (88198) 
La Grande-Fosse (88213) 
Grandrupt (88215) 
Granges-Aumontzey (88218) 
La Houssière (88244) 
Hurbache (88245) 
Lesseux (88268) 
Liézey (88269) 
Lubine (88275) 
Lusse (88276) 
Luvigny (88277) 
Mandray (88284) 
Ménil-de-Senones (88300) 
Le Mont (88306) 
Mortagne (88315) 
Moussey (88317) 
Moyenmoutier (88319) 
Nayemont-les-Fosses (88320) 
Neuvillers-sur-Fave (88326) 
Nompatelize (88328) 
Pair-et-Grandrupt (88341) 
La Petite-Fosse (88345) 
La Petite-Raon (88346) 
Plainfaing (88349) 
Les Poulières (88356) 
Provenchères-et-Colroy (88361) 
Le Puid (88362) 
Raon-l'Étape (88372) 
Raon-sur-Plaine (88373) 
Raves (88375) 
Rehaupal (88380) 
Remomeix (88386) 
Rochesson (88391) 
Les Rouges-Eaux (88398) 
Saint-Dié-des-Vosges (88413) 
Sainte-Marguerite (88424) 
Saint-Jean-d'Ormont (88419) 
Saint-Léonard (88423) 
Saint-Michel-sur-Meurthe (88428) 
Saint-Remy (88435) 
Saint-Stail (88436) 
La Salle (88438) 
Sapois (88442) 
Le Saulcy (88444) 
Saulcy-sur-Meurthe (88445) 
Saulxures-sur-Moselotte (88447) 
Senones (88451) 
Le Syndicat (88462) 
Taintrux (88463) 
Tendon (88464) 
Thiéfosse (88467) 
Le Tholy (88470) 
Vagney (88486) 
Le Valtin (88492) 
Ventron (88500) 
Le Vermont (88501) 
Vexaincourt (88503) 
Vienville (88505) 
Vieux-Moulin (88506) 
La Voivre (88519) 
Wisembach (88526) 
Xonrupt-Longemer (88531)

History

The arrondissement of Saint-Dié-des-Vosges was created in 1800. At the January 2019 reorganisation of the arrondissements of Vosges, it lost seven communes to and gained 15 communes from the arrondissement of Épinal.

As a result of the reorganisation of the cantons of France which came into effect in 2015, the borders of the cantons are no longer related to the borders of the arrondissements. The cantons of the arrondissement of Saint-Dié-des-Vosges were, as of January 2015:

 Brouvelieures
 Corcieux
 Fraize
 Gérardmer
 Provenchères-sur-Fave
 Raon-l'Étape
 Saint-Dié-des-Vosges-Est
 Saint-Dié-des-Vosges-Ouest
 Senones

References

Saint-Die-des-Vosges